is a town located in Tagawa District, Fukuoka Prefecture, Japan.

As of April 30, 2017, the town has an estimated population of 17,324 and a density of 480 persons per km². The total area is 36.12 km².

References

External links

Kawasaki official website 

Towns in Fukuoka Prefecture